Temple Hill is a mountain in the Galty Mountains, in County Limerick, Ireland. In the Bronze Age it was a place of worship.

References 
 Listing at mountainviews.ie

Marilyns of Ireland
Mountains and hills of County Limerick
Mountains under 1000 metres